Eastbourne Buses was a bus operator running within the Borough of Eastbourne and into the surrounding area, including Pevensey, Hailsham, Tunbridge Wells, Uckfield, and East Grinstead, with a fleet of around 50 vehicles. Eastbourne Buses was sold to the Stagecoach Group on 18 December 2008 for £3.7 million, beating Go-Ahead to the ownership.

History 
Formed in April 1903, Eastbourne Buses claimed to be the first and oldest municipally owned motor bus operator in the world; the first bus service operated between Eastbourne railway station and Old Town.

In 2007, the company was fined over £25,000 for two accidents involving employees, one of which was fatal.

At the beginning of 2008, the traffic commissioner fined the company for failing to run services on time.

June 2008 reports had announced Eastbourne Council's intention to sell its majority shareholding in the company.

Sale to Stagecoach 
In early November 2008, local press reports had indicated that the company was to be sold by the end of the year to either the Go-Ahead Group or Stagecoach Group. The employees' trade union, Unite, wrote to Eastbourne Borough Council to ask the Council to sell to the Go-Ahead Group, because of work conditions and a superior fleet.

On 25 November 2008, it was announced that Stagecoach was the preferred bidder. On 18 December 2008, Stagecoach took control of the Birch Road Depot.

It is not the first time Stagecoach have run services in Eastbourne. They had run services until late in 2000 before they were withdrawn. They still operate services to Hastings and Bexhill from Eastbourne.

The sale has caused considerable controversy, with MPs criticising the secrecy surrounding the sale and blaming each other's parties for the state the Eastbourne Buses got into, the Liberal Democrats claiming the Conservatives "failed to support Eastbourne Buses".

There has also been criticism of the low sale price for the company – revealed at £3.7 million, lower than the original report of 4 - and criticism of Stagecoach, one MP saying that the company has effectively been "given away for nothing". However, it was revealed that Go-Ahead had bid much lower at £2.85 million, so the council was forced to sell to Stagecoach, despite the union's calls.

In April 2007 the company nearly had to close as it was unable to pay for fuel. At that stage it was inevitable that the company would soon have to be sold.

In January 2009, rival company Cavendish Motor Services was also bought by the Stagecoach Group, making both companies one.

The Eastbourne Buses name was discontinued on 8 March 2009, with operations rebranded as Stagecoach in Eastbourne, which is now under the East Sussex operations of Stagecoach UK Bus.

Routes 
Eastbourne Buses operated a number of different service types, including local services around Eastbourne town, as well as long-distance routes.

Town services 
Eastbourne Buses ran five in-town services.

Long-distance services 
There were 3 long-distance services.

School services 
There were 2 school services.

Fleet 

The Eastbourne bus fleet comprised a number of different vehicle types, of both older and new vehicles. Twelve new vehicles joined the fleet in January 2009 as part of the Stagecoach takeover, the majority of which were Alexander Dennis Enviro300s.

Fleet before takeover:

Single decker
 3 Dennis Dart SLF/Marshall
 3 Dennis Dart SLF/Plaxton
 1 Dennis Dart SLF/Caetano
 8 DAF SB220/Ikarus
 5 DAF SB220/Northern Counties
 6 DAF SB120/Wright Cadet
 10 MAN 14.220/MCV Evolution

Double decker
 - Leyland Atlantean
 2 Leyland Olympian/Alexander
 1 DAF DB250/Northern Counties
 6 DAF DB250/Optare Spectra
 4 DAF DB250/Alexander ALX400

Trivia 
One of the company's buses featured in the 2008 film Angus, Thongs and Perfect Snogging.

See also 
 List of bus operators of the United Kingdom
 Brighton & Hove
 Cavendish Motor Services
 Stagecoach in Hastings
 Stagecoach Group

References

External links 

History of Eastbourne
Former bus operators in East Sussex
Former bus operators in West Sussex
Former bus operators in Kent
Stagecoach Group bus operators in England